The incisive papilla is an oval midline mucosal prominence of the anterior hard palate overlying the incisive fossa. It is situated posteriorly to the central incisors, and represents the anterior extremity of the palatine raphe.

The incisive papilla marks the position of the foetal nasopalatine canal.

Anatomy

Variation 
Though generally referred to as round or oval in shape, the shape of the incisive papilla has been noted to vary in shape, its other potential shapes have been described as including: pear, spindle, flame, cylindrical, tapering, or dumb bell shaped.

Microanatomy 
The incisive papilla consist of dense connective tissue. It is lined with simple or pseudostratified columnar epithelium, and is often keratinized.

Clinical significance 
Pressure exerted upon the incisive papilla by maxillary dentures may cause pain or discomfort.

The incisive papilla is utilized as an anatomical landmark when administering a nasopalatine nerve block; the needle is inserted at a 45° angle just lateral to the incisive papilla.

See also 
Papilla (disambiguation)

References

External links 
 Diagram at ana.bris.ac.uk
 Diagram at bris.ac.uk

Palate